Natalie Neita-Garvey (née Neita) is a Jamaican politician from the People's National Party. She was Minister of Sport in 2015.

Political career 
In January 2018 she was charged with assault of a co-worker.

References 

Living people
21st-century Jamaican politicians
21st-century Jamaican women politicians
Women government ministers of Jamaica
Members of the House of Representatives of Jamaica
People's National Party (Jamaica) politicians
People from Saint Catherine Parish
Jamaican criminals
Year of birth missing (living people)
Members of the 11th Parliament of Jamaica
Members of the 12th Parliament of Jamaica
Members of the 13th Parliament of Jamaica
Members of the 14th Parliament of Jamaica